The Kasina Wielka witch trial occurred in 1634 in the small rural village of Prąmnik in Kraków, Poland. Zofia Konstancja and Agnieszka Michałowska were convicted of witchcraft. Konstancia was burned at the stake on 11 August 1634, and Michałowska was burned on 5 September 1634. 

The two women were accused of using witchcraft against the Pramnik Mill belonging to the Dominican monastery in Kraków, which resulted in damage to the Prąmnicki fields, and of causing harm to one of the monks, i.e. the Protas factor.

This is the only rural witchcraft trial  that resulted in a death sentence in Poland, and one of a few in Europe.

The Pramnik Mill still stands in Prądnik Czerwony in Kraków on Dominikana Street, a historic example of a medieval watermill.

References

1634 in the Polish–Lithuanian Commonwealth
History of Kraków
Religion in Kraków
Witch trials in Poland